James Burr V Allred (March 29, 1899 – September 24, 1959) was the 33rd governor of Texas.  He later served, twice, as a United States district judge of the United States District Court for the Southern District of Texas.

Education and career
Born on March 29, 1899, in Bowie, Texas, the son of Renne Allred Sr. and Mary Magdalene (Henson), James V Allred graduated from Bowie High School in 1917. He enrolled at Rice Institute (now Rice University) but withdrew for financial reasons. He then served with the United States Immigration Service. He served in the United States Navy from 1918 to 1919. He received a Bachelor of Laws in 1921 from Cumberland School of Law (then part of Cumberland University, now part of Samford University). He was in private practice in Wichita Falls, Texas from 1921 to 1923 and from 1926 to 1931. He was district attorney in Wichita Falls from 1923 to 1926. He was Attorney General of Texas from 1931 to 1935. He was Governor of Texas from 1935 to 1939. He was an ardent Democrat and supporter of the New Deal policies of President Franklin D. Roosevelt.

First district court term
Allred received a recess appointment to the United States District Court for the Southern District of Texas on July 11, 1938, but he declined the appointment.
He was nominated by President Franklin D. Roosevelt on January 5, 1939, to the United States District Court for the Southern District of Texas, to a new seat authorized by 52 Stat. 584. He was confirmed by the United States Senate on February 16, 1939, and received his commission on February 23, 1939. His service ended on May 15, 1942, due to his resignation.

Senate run and intervening service
Allred was an unsuccessful candidate for the United States Senate from Texas in 1942. He then returned to private practice in Houston, Texas, from 1943 to 1949.

Second district court term
Allred was nominated by President Harry S. Truman on September 23, 1949, to the United States District Court for the Southern District of Texas, to a new seat authorized by 63 Stat. 493. He was confirmed by the United States Senate on October 12, 1949, and received his commission on October 13, 1949. His service ended with his death on September 24, 1959, in Corpus Christi, Texas.

Honor

James V. Allred Unit, a Texas Department of Criminal Justice (TDCJ) state prison for men in Wichita Falls, Texas, is named for Allred.

Note

References

Sources
 Ex-Governor Allred Dies After Seizure. Dallas Morning News, September 25, 1959, sec. I, p. 1.
 Fiery Allred Got Into Politics Early. Dallas Morning News, September 25, 1959, sec. I, p. 3.
 James V Allred of U.S. Bench, 60. New York Times, September 25, 1959.
 Joe Betsy Allred, widow of former governor, dies. Dallas Morning News, June 9, 1993, p. 30A.

External links
 
 Legislative Messages of Hon. James V Allred, Governor of Texas 1935-1939, hosted by the Portal to Texas History
 
 

|-

|-

|-

|-

1899 births
1959 deaths
People from Bowie, Texas
United States Navy personnel of World War I
People from Wichita Falls, Texas
Rice University alumni
Cumberland University alumni
Texas Attorneys General
Democratic Party governors of Texas
People from Corpus Christi, Texas
Judges of the United States District Court for the Southern District of Texas
United States district court judges appointed by Franklin D. Roosevelt
20th-century American judges
20th-century American lawyers
20th-century American politicians
United States district court judges appointed by Harry S. Truman